The Battle of Marj Dābiq (meaning "the meadow of Dābiq"), a decisive military engagement in Middle Eastern history, was fought on 24 August 1516, near the town of Dabiq, 44 km north of Aleppo (modern Syria). The battle was part of the 1516–17 war between the Ottoman Empire and the Mamluk Sultanate, which ended in an Ottoman victory and conquest of much of the Middle East and brought about the destruction of the Mamluk Sultanate. The Ottoman victory in the battle gave Selim's armies control of the entire region of Syria and opened the door to the conquest of Egypt.

Battle preparations 
Sultan Al-Ashraf Qansuh al-Ghawri spent the winter of 1515 and the spring of 1516 I preparing an army, which he proposed leading to the disturbed confines of Asia Minor. Before beginning the march, Selim I sent an embassy promising in friendly terms to agree to Mamluk requests to appoint an Egyptian vassal to the Beylik of Dulkadir, a longstanding buffer state between Mamluks and Ottomans, and to reopen the frontier to the traffic of goods and slaves. On 18 May Al-Ashraf Qansuh al-Ghawri set out from Cairo with a large force, appointed well in all respects but artillery.

Leaving Al-Ashraf Tuman bay II in control of Cairo, the Sultan and his army marched north with great pomp and were accompanied by music, singing and festivity. The hosts included fifteen high-ranking emirs of a Thousand, 5,000 of his own royal Mamluks, and militia conscripts and were supplemented during the march by additional Syrian and Bedouin contingents. High officers of state, the Abbasid caliph Al-Mutawakkil III, sheikhs, and courtiers, together with muezzins, physicians and musicians, followed in his train.

On the way, al-Ghawri also received Ahmed, son of the late pretender to the Ottoman throne (Selim I's nephew), and brought him along with courtly honors in the hope of drawing over his sympathizers from the Ottoman force. Advancing slowly Al-Ashraf Qansuh al-Ghawri entered Damascus on 9 June, with carpets spread in his pathway, and European merchants scattered gold to the crowd. After a few days' stay, advancing at a leisurely pace, he was received at Homs and Hama with festivities and moved towards Aleppo.

Meanwhile, another embassy arrived from the Ottoman camp, which under the pretense of peace brought lavish presents to the Sultan, Caliph Al-Mutawakkil III, and his vizier. The gifts were accompanied by a request from Selim I for a supply of Egyptian sugar and confectionery. The envoy intimated that problems with the Shah of Persia Ismail I had forced him again to prepare for war and take the field. Chancellor Mughla Bey was sent back with counter-gifts, but by the time that he reached the Ottoman camp, Selim I had thrown off his ruse of peace. The Ottomans scorned the embassy and sent the chancellor back with his head and beard shaved and riding a lame mount.

Mamluk betrayal 
At Aleppo, the Mamluk governor Khai'r Bey had secretly sided with the Porte. Though the governor of Damascus had disclosed that to the Sultan, he discredited the information. To veil his treachery, Khai'r Bey gave al-Ghawri a splendid reception, but the inhabitants were enraged against the Mamluks by their behavior in the city.

It was at that point that Mughla Bey made his miserable return by reporting that Selim and his forces were advancing against them. With that immediate threat thrust upon them, the emirs, qadis, and royal Mamluks renewed their oaths of loyalty to the sultan. Al-Ghawri also distributed gifts to his personal forces, which displeased the other Mamluks. The sultan, dissuaded by the emir Janberdi al-Ghazali, ignored a final warning about Khai'r Bey's disloyalty before he took to the field.

Battle 
The Mamluk army advanced and on 20 August made camp at the plain of Marj Dabiq, a day's journey north of Aleppo. There, al-Ghawri and his men awaited the enemy's approach on this plain, where the sultanate's fate would soon be decided. According to the History of Egypt composed by Muḥammad ibn Aḥmad ibn Iyas, the Mamluks arranged themselves with the Sultan occupying the center column. Sibay, the Governor of Damascus, commanded the right flank, and Khai'r Bey, governor of Aleppo, took the left.

The marshal Sûdûn Adjami was the first to enter combat, followed by Sibay, leading an experienced corps of veteran Mamluk warriors. They rushed into battle and managed to kill several thousand Turkish soldiers in the first hours of fighting. This advantage forced the opposite Ottoman wing to begin a withdrawal, and the Mamluk forces under Sibay succeeded in taking several pieces of artillery and capturing some fusiliers. Selim considered retreat or requesting a truce.

It was at this point that the battle turned against the Mamluks. A rumor began to spread that al-Ghawri had ordered the recruits to hold their position, avoid combat, and leave the fighting to the veteran soldiers who were already engaged in battle. When Marshall Sûdûn Adjami and Sibay, who were leading the attack, were suddenly killed, panic broke out in the Mamluks' advancing right flank. Meanwhile, Khai'r Bey, in command of the left flank, called for a retreat. The fact that his forces were the first to quit the field was considered evidence of the man's betrayal.

Ibn Iyas offered the following account of the Mamluk defeat:

Accounts vary, however, as to how exactly Al-Ashraf Qansuh al-Ghawri met his end. Khai'r Bey may have spread a report of his death to precipitate the Egyptians' rout. According to one version of the battle, the sultan was found alive on the field and his head cut off and buried to prevent its falling into the enemy's hands. The Ottoman account relates that he was beheaded by a Turkish soldier, whom Selim initially insisted on executing but later pardoned. The Egyptian historian Ibn Iyas, by comparison, wrote that there were some who said he had died of a ruptured gallbladder and others who said he had poisoned himself.

Aftermath 
Selim I, welcomed by the inhabitants as a deliverer from the excesses of the Mamluks, entered Aleppo in triumph. He received the Abbasid caliph warmly, but upbraided the Islamic judges and jurists for their failure to check Mamluk misrule. Joined by Khai'r Bey and other Egyptian officers, he proceeded to the Citadel.

From Aleppo, he marched with his forces to Damascus, where terror prevailed. Beyond some attempts to protect the city by flooding the plain around, the remnants of the Mamluk forces had done nothing substantial to oppose the enemy. Discord amongst the emirs had paralyzed the army and prevented any decisive action that might have affected the subsequent course of events. Some of al-Ghawri's lieutenants supported Emir Janberdi Al-Ghazali as the new sultan, but others favoured the deceased ruler's son. As the Ottomans approached, however, resistance dissolved, as the remaining forces either went over to their side or fled to Egypt. Selim I entered Damascus in mid-October, and the inhabitants readily surrendered to the conquerors.

See also

Ottoman–Mamluk War (1516–17)

Notes

Bibliography

Marj Dabiq
Marj Dabiq
Marj Dabiq
1516 in Asia
1510s in Ottoman Syria
1516 in the Ottoman Empire